The Aegean Center for the Fine Arts was founded in 1966 by Brett Taylor, and has been overseen by its director, John Pack, since 1984. The center is an independent, non-profit  program located in Paros, Greece and Pistoia, Italy. Courses are offered in two semester-long sessions per year as well as summer intensive workshops and include painting, drawing, photography, printmaking, creative writing, art history, literature and classical singing. The center accepts a maximum of 24 students into each of its semester programs.

Taylor was both a painter and musician who gained a passion for Greece from one of his teachers at the Tyler School of Art in Philadelphia. Taylor's writings described the intentions for his program: "...to get away from mass production and to meet a need for individualized instruction in an unfamiliar and very different setting which fosters a fresh perspective and independence..."  Under the directorship of John Pack the Center has undergone many changes in its programs and infrastructure. The Center and its cause continues to thrive this half century plus since its founding.

References

External links 
 
 The Institute of International Education - IIE
 The European League of Institutes of the Arts - ELIA
 The Association of American Colleges and Universities - AAC&U
 Herron School of Art and Design

Art schools in Greece
Art schools in Italy
Study abroad programs
Greece–Italy relations